The 1921 population census in Bosnia and Herzegovina was the fifth census of the population of Bosnia and Herzegovina. On the territory of 51,200 km2 1,890,440 persons lived. The Kingdom of Serbs, Croats and Slovenes conducted a population census on 31 January 1921.

Results by religion

Results by nationality

References 

Censuses in Bosnia and Herzegovina
1921 in Bosnia and Herzegovina
Bosnia